Quarry is the surname of:

 Bobby Quarry (born 1962), American boxer, youngest brother of Jerry and Mike Quarry
 Jerry Quarry (1945–1999), American heavyweight boxer
 Mike Quarry (1951–2006), American light heavyweight boxer, brother of Jerry Quarry
 Robert Quarry (1925–2009), American actor

Manx-language surnames